Attenborolimulus is an extinct genus of horseshoe crab with one known species: Attenborolimulus superspinosus. This genus is known from the Petropavlovka formation, dating to the Olenekian age (early Triassic), and is named after David Attenborough for his work in conservation and science communication.

See also
 List of things named after David Attenborough and his works

References

Xiphosura
Prehistoric chelicerates
Fossil taxa described in 2021